Paul Benjamin (February 4, 1938 – June 28, 2019) was an American actor whose career spanned six decades. Benjamin appeared in dozens of films and television shows beginning in the late 1960s.

Biography
Born to Fair, a Baptist preacher (1890–1950) and Rosa Benjamin (née Butler; 1895–1940) in Pelion, South Carolina, Benjamin was the youngest of 12 children. Benjamin moved to Columbia, South Carolina with an older brother after the death of his parents. Benjamin attended C.A. Johnson High School and later enrolled at Benedict College.

Career
Benjamin relocated to New York and studied at the Herbert Berghof Studio. He made his film debut in 1969 as a bartender in Midnight Cowboy. After small roles in Sidney Lumet's The Anderson Tapes (1971) and Born to Win (1971), he did extensive television work in the 1970s. A few notable exceptions were a major role in Barry Shear's Across 110th Street (1972), and smaller parts in Shear's western The Deadly Trackers (1973), Michael Campus' The Education of Sonny Carson (1974), Arthur Marks' Friday Foster (1975), Gordon Parks' biopic Leadbelly (1976), and Don Siegel's prison film Escape from Alcatraz (1979). He also performed in the TV adaptations of I Know Why the Caged Bird Sings (1979) and Gideon's Trumpet (1980). He later starred in the 1987 HBO movie The Man Who Broke 1,000 Chains, based on the novel by Robert E. Burns. On the big screen in the 1980s and 1990s, Benjamin worked with some well-known actors and directors. He acted in Some Kind of Hero (1982) opposite Richard Pryor, Martin Ritt's drama film Nuts (1987) starring Barbra Streisand, Pink Cadillac (1989) with Clint Eastwood, Spike Lee's Do the Right Thing (1989), Robert Townsend's The Five Heartbeats (1991), Bill Duke's Hoodlum (1997), and John Singleton's Rosewood (1997).

On television, he appeared in the 1988 episode of In The Heat of the Night as a death row inmate and in the 1994 pilot episode of ER, which led to his recurring role of homeless man Al Ervin during the next few seasons. Benjamin also worked on the American Masters documentary of Pulitzer Prize-winning author Ralph Ellison, which aired on PBS.  He also acted in an episode of the 14th season of Law & Order entitled "Identity" (2003) as well as an episode of The Shield.   After 2000, he acted mainly in independent films like Stanley's Gig, The Station Agent, Deacons For Defense, and James Hunter's 2005 drama Back in the Day.

Personal life and death
Benjamin died on June 28, 2019, in Los Angeles at age 81.

Filmography

Midnight Cowboy (1969) - Bartender - New York
The Anderson Tapes (1971) - Jimmy
Born to Win (1971) - Fixer
Across 110th Street (1972) - Jim Harris
The Deadly Trackers (1973) - Jacob 
The Education of Sonny Carson (1974) - Pops
Distance (1975) - Sgt. Elwood Horne
Friday Foster (1975) - Sen. David Lee Hart
Leadbelly (1976) - Wes Ledbetter
One in a Million: The Ron LeFlore Story (1978) - John LeFlore
I Know Why the Caged Bird Sings (1979, TV Movie) - Freeman
Escape from Alcatraz (1979) - English
Gideon's Trumpet (1980, TV Movie) - Artis
Some Kind of Hero (1982) - Leon
Deadly Force (1983) - Lester
Nuts (1987) - Harry Harrison
Do the Right Thing (1989) - ML
Pink Cadillac (1989) - Judge
The Five Heartbeats (1991) - Mr. King
The Super (1991) - Gilliam
Drop Squad (1994) - Wellington Cosbie
The Fence (1994) - Del Reston
Rosewood (1997) - James Carrier
Hoodlum (1997) - Whispers
The Breaks (1999) - Clerk
Stanley's Gig (2000) - Teddy Branson
The Station Agent (2003) - Henry Styles
Back in the Day (2005) - Cody
Ascension Day (2007) - Sam
The Tall Man (2011) - Dallas
Occupy, Texas (2016) - Mr. Goodman

References

External links

1938 births
2019 deaths
20th-century African-American people
21st-century African-American people
Age controversies
American male film actors
American male television actors
People from Lexington County, South Carolina
Male actors from South Carolina
African-American male actors